Siedliska  is a village in the administrative district of Gmina Miechów, within Miechów County, Lesser Poland Voivodeship, in southern Poland.

The village has a population of 130.

History 
On March 15, 1943, during the German occupation of Poland, five-member family of Baranek were executed in Siedliska for helping Jews. Also, four Jewish refugees were murdered with them.

References

Villages in Miechów County